Arthur Howcroft (died 25 January 1976) was a British trade union leader.

Howcroft worked as a manager in the Bolton cotton mills, and he joined the Bolton and District Managers' and Overlookers' Association. In 1949, he was elected as general secretary of the small union.  The union was affiliated to the General Union of Loom Overlookers (GULO), and in 1963, he was elected as general secretary of GULO.

While GULO was not a large organisation, Howcroft became prominent through representing it on other bodies.  From 1964, he served on the Management Committee of the General Federation of Trade Unions (GFTU), and in 1971/72, he was chair of the GFTU.  He briefly served as secretary of the Northern Counties Textile Trades Federation.  Under his leadership, GULO formed the British Federation of Textile Technicians, to work more closely with other unions in the industry.

Howcroft died early in 1976, still in office.

References

Year of birth missing
1976 deaths
General secretaries of British trade unions
People from Bolton
Presidents of the General Federation of Trade Unions (UK)